The Rukwa languages are a group of Bantu languages established by Nurse (1988) and Fourshey (2002). They constitute half of Guthrie's Zone M, plus Bungu. The languages, or clusters, along with their Guthrie identifications, are: 

Rungwe (M30): Nyakyusa–Ngonde (Konde), Ndali
Mbozi
Mbeya
Bungu (Wungu, F20)
Safwa (M20)
South Mbeya (M20): Malila; Lambya–Sukwa, Nyiha
Mwika
Nyika (M20)
North Mwika (M10): Pimbwe, Rungwa
Plateau Mwika:
Fipa (M10)
South: Wanda, Namwanga–Iwa–Tambo (M20), Mambwe-Lungu (M10)

Nurse (1988) had established a more limited Mbozi ("Corridor"), without Pimbwe or Bungu, and with the addition of Rungwe tentative.

Maho (2009) adds Penja (possibly extinct), to M30, and Kulwe as closest to Fipa.

Notes